The 2014 FIFA World Cup CONMEBOL–AFC qualification play-off were a series of two-legged home-and-away ties between the fifth-placed team of the Asian qualifying tournament, Jordan, and the fifth-placed team from the South American qualifying tournament, Uruguay.

The games were played on 13 and 20 November 2013.

Overview 
It was the fourth consecutive FIFA World Cup play-off that Uruguay has participated in after 3–1 on aggregate win over Australia for Korea/Japan 2002, losing to Australia 4–2 on penalties for Germany 2006 and 2–1 on aggregate win over Costa Rica for South Africa 2010.

This was Jordan's best finish in their FIFA World Cup qualification history.

The draw for the order in which the two matches would be played was held by FIFA on 30 July 2011 at the World Cup Preliminary Draw.

Match details

First leg 

|valign="top"|
|valign="top" width="50%"|

|}

Second leg 

|valign="top"|
|valign="top" width="50%"|

|}

Live broadcast

South America 

  South America: beIN Sports
 : TyC Sports (live on Channels 17, 101 and 600 from Cablevisión)
 : Tenfield (broadcast live on VTV) (live on Channel 6 from Cablevisión)
 : Tigo Sports (live on Channels 20, 100 and 701 (HD) from TigoStar)
 : TV Cable Sports
 : SporTV

Middle East 
 : beIN Sports

North America 

 : beIN Sports (available in English and Spanish)
 : TDN
 : beIN Sports

Central America 

 : Telesport
 : Tigo Sports (Central America feed)
 : Tigo Sports
 : TVMax (live)

Europe 

 : Sport TV
 : Sky Sports
 : Gol Televisión
 : beIN Sports

References 

World Cup play-off
5
World Cup play-off
World Cup play-off
FIFA World Cup qualification inter-confederation play-offs
2013
2013
qual
World Cup play-off
November 2013 sports events in Asia
November 2013 sports events in South America
2010s in Montevideo
Sports competitions in Montevideo
21st century in Amman
Sports competitions in Amman
International association football competitions hosted by Jordan
International association football competitions hosted by Uruguay